Sex Matters is a Canadian talk show that broadcasts on CP24 exploring many issues about human sexuality. The program is hosted by CP24's Cynthia Loyst. Live broadcasts of the program airs Thursday and Friday nights at 10:30 pm on CP24. CP24 also rebroadcasts the program every Saturday and Sunday nights at 10:30 pm. Star! also airs the program every Saturday and Sunday nights at 11:30 pm. The program first aired on February 11, 2010 on CP24.

See also
 SexTV

External links
 

2010 Canadian television series debuts
Sex education television series
2010s Canadian documentary television series